Firmiana major is a species of flowering plant in the family Malvaceae. It is found only in China in the Yunnan province. It is threatened by habitat loss.

References

Sterculioideae
Taxonomy articles created by Polbot
Plants described in 1916